Banafsha bint Abdullah al-Rumiyyah (Arabic: بنفشة بنت عبد الله الرمية) (died 1201) was a slave consort of the Abbasid caliph Al-Mustadi (r. 1170–1180).

Her origin is termed to have been "Roman" or Rumiyya, that is to say of Greek origin from the Byzantine Empire of Constantinople. She was reportedly the daughter of Abdullah, a Greek.  She was a slave bought to the Harem of the Caliph. As was the custom she was compelled to convert to Islam and was given a new name.

She became Al-Mustadi's favourite concubine.  The Caliph manumitted her and married her. He had a palace built for her personal use in Baghdad.

Banafsha are described as loving and merciful. She did not give birth to a son, but she successfully supported her stepson Al-Nasir to the succession before his brother prince Hashem. Because of this, she was favored by Al-Nasir when he became Caliph in 1180.

It was impossible for her to leave the harem, but she became known for her donations and charitable projects, which was a common method for the secluded harem wives of the Caliphs to create a public name for themselves. She died on 27 December 1201 and was buried in the mausoleum of Zumurrud Khatun in Sheikh Maarouf Cemetery.

She is known as the founder of the Hanbali Banafsha School in Baghdad (1174). She also built a bridge between the Karkh and Al-Rusafa disctrics in Baghdad.

References

1201 deaths
Concubines of the Abbasid caliphs
12th-century women from the Abbasid Caliphate
13th-century women from the Abbasid Caliphate
12th-century Greek people